Lisa Hed (born 5 July 1973) is a Swedish professional golfer. She played on the Ladies European Tour and was runner-up at the 2000 Ladies Austrian Open.

Career
Hed turned professional in 1993 and joined the Swedish Golf Tour. In 1997, she came close to securing her maiden professional title, losing a playoff for the Volvo Anläggningsmaskiner Ladies Open. By 1999, she had hit her stride, recording nine top-10 finishes including two wins, and ended the 1999 season top of the Order of Merit. In 2000, she won four tournaments including the Felix Finnish Ladies Open, and in 2002, she won the Nykredit Ladies Open in Denmark. She lost the final of the 2008 SM Match to Anna Nordqvist.

Hed finished fifth at Q-School to join the Ladies European Tour in 2000. In the 2000 season on the LET, she only missed two cuts, at the Women's British Open and Ladies Italian Open, while recording top-10 finishes at the Ladies Irish Open and Ladies German Open, as well as a runner-up finish at the Ladies Austrian Open, one stroke behind Patricia Meunier-Lebouc. She finished 15th on the LET Order of Merit, but lost out on the Rookie of the Year award to 28th placed Giulia Sergas, on account of having started five LET tournaments in 1998.

In 2001, she recorded top-10 finishes at the Taiwan Ladies Open, WPGA Championship of Europe and Ladies German Open to finish 22nd in the LET Order of Merit.

Professional wins (8)

Swedish Golf Tour (8)

References

External links

Swedish female golfers
Ladies European Tour golfers
Sportspeople from Gothenburg
1973 births
Living people
21st-century Swedish women